One Hot Summer Night is a 1998 television movie with Erika Eleniak, Brian Wimmer, Tobin Bell, and Barry Bostwick. The film was directed by James A. Contner.

Plot 
Art Brooks and Kelly Moore are a couple who get married. But Kelly realizes that Art is an alcoholic, and he beats her. She starts a relationship with the lawyer Richard Linsky. Art is then found dead, with Richard being convicted and imprisoned.

Cast 
Barry Bostwick as Art Brooks
Erika Eleniak as Kelly Moore Brooks 
Brian Wimmer as Richard Linsky
Tobin Bell as Vincent "Coupe" De Ville
Stephen Macht as Abel Ganz
Anne De Salvo as D.A. Pina 
Lochlyn Munro as Detective Eddie Beltran
Christopher Darden as Detective Mingus
Alannah Ong as Lisa
Corrie Clark as Jenna Brooks
Ken Roberts as Gene Walsh
Jerry Wasserman as Judge Block
John Taylor as Minister
Maria Herrera as Clerk

References

External links

1998 television films
1998 films
American television films
Films directed by James A. Contner